The 2003 Central Asian Games also known as the 5th Central Asian Games were held in Dushanbe, Tajikistan in 2003.

Participating nations
  Kazakhstan
  Kyrgyzstan
  Tajikistan
  Turkmenistan
  Uzbekistan

Sports

Medal table

References

Central Asian Games
Central Asian Games, 2003
Central Asian Games, 2003
Sport in Dushanbe
Central Asian Games
Multi-sport events in Tajikistan
International sports competitions hosted by Tajikistan